Magosphaera planula was a spherical multiflagellated multicellular microorganism discovered by Ernst Haeckel in September 1869 while he was collecting sponges off Gisøy island off the coast of Norway. He claimed to have seen it break up into separate cells which then became amoeboid. Nobody else has found it, and he kept no specimens of it. It played an important part in theories of metazoan phylogeny into the early 20th century.

References 

Enigmatic eukaryote taxa
Taxa named by Ernst Haeckel